Dawoud Abdallah Rajiha (‎; 1947 – 18 July 2012), forename sometimes transliterated Dawood or Daoud, surname sometimes transliterated Rajha, was the Syrian minister of defense from 2011 to July 2012 when he was assassinated along with other senior military officers by armed opposition forces during the country's Civil War. From 2009 to 2011, Rajiha served as chief of staff of the Syrian Army.

Early life
Rajiha, a Greek Orthodox Arab Christian, was born in Damascus in 1947. A specialist in artillery, he graduated from Syria's military academy in 1967.

Military education
Dawoud Abdallah Rajiha attended different courses and a higher military education: 
 Bachelor in Military Sciences, Field Artillery Officer, Syrian Military Academy
 Staff Course
 General Command and Staff Course
 Higher Staff Course (War Course)

Career
Rajiha attained the rank of major general in 1998 and was appointed as the Syrian Army's deputy chief of staff six years later, in 2004. In 2005, he received a promotion to the rank of general called Imad (a rank in the Syrian armed forces between major general and lieutenant general). When Ali Habib Mahmud was named to head the ministry of defense in 2009, Rajiha was given the position of army chief of staff. He held this position in 2011, when the Syrian civil war began. On 8 August 2011, he was chosen by President Bashar al-Assad to replace Mahmud as minister of defense.

Rumored death
On 20 May 2012, the Damascus council of the Free Syrian Army, among the rebel organizations opposed to the Assad government, alleged that it had assassinated Rajiha and the seven other members of the government's Central Crisis Management Cell (CCMC).  It was since proven that the allegations were false and were rebels propaganda. Members of the unit, including former minister of defense Hasan Turkmani, were shown on Syrian television to be alive, and the rebels later stated that only Rajiha's deputy, General Assef Shawkat, and a second official who was not named. Shawkat, the brother-in-law of President Assad, was later shown to have survived, as well. In June 2012, the matter of Rajiha's alleged death was permanently resolved when it was confirmed that he remained Assad's defense minister in the newly formed cabinet.

Personal life
Rajiha was married and had four children.

Assassination and funeral
Almost two months after the date of his alleged death, Rajiha was assassinated in a bombing of a meeting of the Central Crisis Management Cell held at the Syrian National Security Building at Rawda Square, Damascus. Among the others killed in the bombing were Hasan Turkmani and Assef Shawkat. Fahd Jassem al-Freij was named by President Assad as Rajiha's successor as minister of defense, while it was announced that Addounia TV would broadcast the minister's funeral. A state funeral was held for him, Hasan Turkmani and Assef Shawkat in Damascus on 20 July 2012. A religious ceremony for him took place in the Holy Cross church in Damascus. Bashar al-Assad did not participate in the ceremony and was represented by vice president Farouk al-Sharaa. A military ceremony was also held for him and other two senior officials, Hassan Turkmani and Assef Shawkat, in the Tomb of the Unknown Soldier on Mount Qasioun, overlooking Damascus.

References

1947 births
2012 deaths
Syrian ministers of defense
Arab Socialist Ba'ath Party – Syria Region politicians
Chiefs of Staff of the Syrian Army
People of the Syrian civil war
Assassinated Syrian politicians
Greek Orthodox Christians from Syria
People from Damascus
Deaths by explosive device
Terrorism deaths in Syria
Military personnel killed in the Syrian civil war
Assassinated military personnel
2012 murders in Syria
Syrian generals
Syrian Christians